Aa Neram Alppa Dooram (മലയാളം: ആ നേരം അല്പദൂരം) is a 1985 Indian Malayalam film,  directed by Thampi Kannanthanam and produced by E. K. Thyagarajan. The film stars Mammootty, Jose Prakash, Manavalan Joseph and Siddique in the lead roles. The film has musical score by Johnson.

Cast

Mammootty as Jammeskutty
Jose Prakash as Muthalali
Manavalan Joseph
Siddique as Alex
Lissy Priyadarshan as Valsala
Unnimary as Rani
Lalu Alex as Dinesh Varma
M. G. Soman as Sudhakaran
Seema as Amminikutty
Sreerekha
Kollam G. K. Pillai
Disco Shanti as a dancer

Soundtrack
The music was composed by Johnson and the lyrics were written by Poovachal Khader.

References

External links
 

1985 films
1980s Malayalam-language films
Films directed by Thampi Kannanthanam